Emamzadeh Askar (also Romanized as Emāmzādeh ʿAskar; also known as Emāmzādeh ʿAsgar) is a village in Kafsh Kanan Rural District, in the Central District of Bahmai County, Kohgiluyeh and Boyer-Ahmad Province, Iran. By the 2006 census, its population was 17, in 4 families.

References 

Populated places in Bahmai County